NA-215 Tharparkar-I is a constituency for the National Assembly of Pakistan.

Members of Parliament

2018-2022: NA-221 Tharparkar-I

Election 2002 

General elections were held on 10 Oct 2002. Ghulam Hyder Samejo of National Alliance won by 59,639 votes.

Election 2008 

General elections were held on 18 Feb 2008. Ghulam Hyder Samejo of PML-Q won by 109,580 votes.

Election 2013 

General elections were held on 11 May 2013. Pir Noor Muhammad Shah Jeelani of PPP won and became the member of National Assembly.

Election 2018 

General elections were held on 25 July 2018.

By-election 2021
By-election was held on 21 February 2021 after the death of Pir Noor Muhammad Shah Jeelani.

See also
NA-214 Umerkot
NA-216 Tharparkar-II

References

External links 
Election result's official website

NA-230